Clean Asia! is a freeware vertically scrolling shooter video game for Microsoft Windows. It was developed by Jonatan "Cactus" Söderström.

Gameplay
Backgrounds are completely black, with enemies and the player appearing as outlines. Bright neon colors are used, giving the game a hypnotic atmosphere. The two ships, known as the Attractor and Reflector, have different gameplay styles. The Attractor is the most unconventional, possessing no weapons, and attacking by ramming enemies and shooting fragments at other enemies. This ship may pick up weapons dropped by enemies. The Reflector is more traditional, with regular weapons. The gun of the Reflector can be charged, causing the player's fighter to stop moving, and can be upgraded by collecting 100 pieces of enemy debris. This debris can give the player shields and bombs.

Plot
In the future, the eyes of all humans are revealed as intelligent unto themselves, having merely used humans as their hosts. They leave their bodies and fly to the moon, develop weapons, and attack the human race, capturing several Asian countries, including China, Thailand, and Korea. Humanity sends two blinded pilot brothers, Mickey R. Dole and Mackey I. Dole, who both possess a sixth sense, to defeat the invaders. The pilots cover their eyes with different methods - a double eyepatch and shaded glasses. Each pilot's custom fighter uses a different attacking technique.

Development
Clean Asia! was started as a 2007 competition entry at shmup-dev.com. The competition's criteria were that the game had to be a shoot 'em up, and include an autofire function. The game was developed using Game Maker, while the music was licensed from another composer. It later won the prize of $200. Söderström tried to be as original as possible when designing the game, drawing inspiration from the ability to pick up enemy debris in 'Nvaders, a game which he thought felt "slightly rushed" and "incomplete". He was also inspired by another, unnamed shoot 'em up, in which the player is able to use an enemy's weapons against them. Söderström believes that the game's most creative aspect is the gameplay of the Attractor. Clean Asia! was developed during the span of two months, with most content being created in the last few weeks.

Reception
Clean Asia! was a finalist in the 2008 Independent Games Festival awards for "Excellence In Visual Arts" and "Excellence in Audio". Gamasutra called it "uniquely presented and stylish." Anthony Burch of Destructoid said that "if you only ever download one free shmup this year, make it Clean Asia!", praising the "slick" graphics and the main design conceit as "stunningly simple".

References

External links
Cactus Software
Download link (archived)

2007 video games
Freeware games
GameMaker Studio games
Indie video games
Vertically scrolling shooters
Video games developed in Sweden
Windows games
Windows-only games
Science fiction video games
Single-player video games
Video games set in the future